An undefined variable in the source code of a computer program is a variable that is accessed in the code but has not been declared by that code.

In some programming languages, an implicit declaration is provided the first time such a variable is encountered at compile time.  In other languages such a usage is considered to be sufficiently serious that a diagnostic being issued and the compilation fails.

Some language definitions initially used the implicit declaration behavior and as they matured provided an option to disable it (e.g. Perl's "use warnings" or Visual Basic's "Option Explicit").

Examples
The following provides some examples of how various programming language implementations respond to undefined variables.  Each code snippet is followed by an error message (if any).

CLISP 
(setf y x)
 *** - EVAL: variable X has no value

C
int main() {
  int y = x;
  return 0;
}
 foo.c: In function `main':
 foo.c:2: error: `x' undeclared (first use in this function)
 foo.c:2: error: (Each undeclared identifier is reported only once
 foo.c:2: error: for each function it appears in.)

JavaScript 

In all other cases, the variable will have the special value .

"use strict";
let y = x;
let y = x;
let x; // causes error on line 1
  ReferenceError: x is not defined
  Source File: file:///c:/temp/foo.js

Lua

y = x
(no error, continuing)
print(y)
 nil

ML (Standard ML of New Jersey) 
val y = x;
 stdIn:1.9 Error: unbound variable or constructor: x

MUMPS

 Set Y=X

 <UNDEF>

OCaml 
let y = x;;
 Unbound value x

Perl
my $y = ($x // 0) + 1; # defined-or operator
 (no error)

PHP 5
$y = $x;
 (no error)

$y="";
$x="";
error_reporting(E_ALL);
$y = $x;
 PHP Notice:  Undefined variable: x in foo.php on line 3

Python 2.4
>>> x = y
Traceback (most recent call last):
  File "<stdin>", line 1, in <module>
NameError: name 'y' is not defined

REXX
signal on novalue
y = x
 +++ Error 30 in line 2: Label not found

Ruby 
irb(main):001:0> y = x
NameError: undefined local variable or method `x' for main:Object
	from (irb):1

Tcl 
% set y $x
can't read "x": no such variable

VBScript 
Dim y
y = x
 (no error)

Option Explicit

Dim y
y = x
 (3, 1) Microsoft VBScript runtime error: Variable is undefined: 'x'

References

Variable (computer science)
Software bugs